The large-billed crow (Corvus macrorhynchos), formerly referred to widely as the jungle crow, is a widespread Asian species of crow. It is very adaptable and is able to survive on a wide range of food sources, making it capable of colonizing new areas, due to which it is often considered a nuisance, especially on islands. It has a large bill, which is the source of its scientific name macrorhynchos (Ancient Greek for "large beak") and it is sometimes known by the common name thick-billed crow. It can also be mistaken for a common raven. Johann Georg Wagler first described the species from a holotype obtained from Java in the year 1827. The eastern jungle crow and Indian jungle crow were once considered conspecific and together called the jungle crow.

Subspecies
It has nine subspecies, and some of them are distinctive vocally, morphologically and genetically, leading to treatments that raise some of them into species status.
C. m. colonorum
C. m. connectens
C. m. intermedius
C. m. japonensis
C. m. macrorhynchos 
C. m. mandschuricus
C. m. osai
C. m. philippinus
C. m. tibetosinensis

Description

The overall size (length: 46–59 cm; 18–23 in.). Wingspan is (100-130 cm; 39-51 in.). Body proportions vary regionally. In the far northeast in Japan, the Kuriles and the Sakhalin peninsula, it is somewhat larger than the carrion crow. All taxa have a relatively long bill with the upper one quite thick and arched, making it look heavy and almost raven-like. Generally, all taxa have dark greyish plumage from the back of the head, neck, shoulders and lower body. Their wings, tail, face, and throat are glossy black. The depth of the grey shading varies across its range.

Distribution and habitat

The range of this species is extensive and stretches from the northeastern Asian seaboard to Afghanistan and eastern Iran in the west, through South and Southeast Asia, to the Lesser Sundas and  Cambodia in the southeast. It occurs in woodland, parks and gardens, cultivated regions with at least some trees, but is a bird of more open country in the south of its range where it is not in competition with the common raven and carrion crow of the north.

Ecology and behaviour

Diet
Extremely versatile in its feeding, it will take food from the ground or in trees. They feed on a wide range of items and will attempt to feed on anything appearing edible, alive or dead, plant or animal. It is also one of the most persistent species and is quite bold, especially in urban areas. In Japan, crows are considered to be a pest, as they rip open garbage bags and take wire coat hangers for their nests. In Sri Lanka, Karunarathna & Amarasinghe (2008) noted that the jungle crow might actually be a, if not the, major predator of local small animals; jungle crows are highly experienced at catching lizards, taking only 45 minutes to find, catch and consume four critically endangered endemic lizards in Horton Plains National Park.

Food caching behaviour has been noted in ssp. culminatus.

Breeding
 
The nest is a platform of twigs, usually high up on a tree with a preference for tall conifers like fir or pine. There are normally 3–5 eggs laid and they are incubated for 17–19 days. The young are fledged usually by about the 35th day. In India, the large-billed crow breed from March to May, but in the plains some of them start even in mid December. The nest is built in a fork of a tree, and is a shallow cup of sticks, sometimes neat and well made, sometimes sketchy and ragged; it is lined with grass roots, wool, rags, vegetable fibre, and similar materials. Some nests have been found to be built partly or exclusively of wire.

The normal clutch consists of four or five eggs, and rarely six or seven. The egg is a broad oval, rather pointed at the smaller end. The texture is hard and fine and there is a fair gloss. The ground colour is any shade of blue-green, and is blotched, speckled and streaked with dull reddish-brown, pale sepia, grey and neutral tint. In size the eggs average about 1.45 by 1.05 inches. The jungle crow can serve as a host for the Asian koel.

Roosting
Gregarious at roosts with many thousands at some roost sites. Large flocks may be seen at dusk arriving at major roost sites. These roosts show no apparent reduction even during the breeding season, and this is because they do not breed during their first year. During the day pairs may be involved in defending their territory but at night they may roost in large groups. They have linear dominance hierarchies that are remembered based on individual recognition.

Voice

The voice is similar to the house crow to which it is closest, but deeper and usually more resonant and described as the usual loud "caa-haa-caa". However, it makes a range of calls, some which could be described as "cau cau" and others that could be mistaken for a woodpecker drumming.

Mortality factors
There are few predators of this species. Filarial parasites have been reported from this species. Pathogenic viruses such as H5N1 have been noted to cause mortality in Japan. Large scale deaths have also been noted to be caused by Clostridium infection and enteritis.

References

External links

 
Jungle crow call (two birds)
Long-billed crow sounds on xeno-canto.

large-billed crow
large-billed crow
Birds of East Asia
Birds of South Asia
Birds of Southeast Asia
Birds of Japan
large-billed crow
Articles containing video clips